Meßkirch (Swabian: Mässkirch) is a town in the district of Sigmaringen in Baden-Württemberg in Germany.

The town was the residence of the counts of Zimmern, widely known through Count Froben Christoph's Zimmern Chronicle (1559–1566).

Geography 
The municipality is composed of following villages and hamlets:

♯The Ringgenbach river flows through Dietershofen, then Ringgenbach, before its confluence into the Ablach east of Leitishofen
  
†Heudorf is a location on the Upper Swabian Baroque Route
 
‡Menningen-Leitishofen was formerly a stop on the extant Radolfzell–Mengen railway

Notable residents
Meßkirch is the birthplace of composer Conradin Kreutzer, archbishop Conrad Gröber, writer and Georg Büchner Prize winner Arnold Stadler and, most famously, the philosopher Martin Heidegger. Also included are the well-known brewers Johann Nepomuk Schalk and his sons Herrmann and Oscar who began the Schalk Brewery in Newark, New Jersey, the first to bring lager beer to New Jersey.
The town's name is also connected with a Renaissance painter whose provisional name is Master of Meßkirch. His Adoration of the Magi can be seen in the church of St. Martin. Katharina von Zimmern (1478-1547), the last abbess of the Fraumünster Abbey in Zürich, was born in Meßkirch.

Culture
The Bodenseesender radio transmitter in the nearby village of Rohrdorf was turned off in February 2012.

History
In 1800, the city was the site of battle of the French Revolutionary Wars.

Campus Galli
Campus Galli is a project to construct an authentic medieval town with a Carolingian monastery, that is located in woodlands near Meßkirch.

References

External links
  
 Old photos of Messkirch and of the Oldtimer car Veritas
 Renaissance castle in Messkirch

Sigmaringen (district)
Baden